The 2023 Michelin Pilot Challenge is the twenty-fourth season of the IMSA SportsCar Challenge and the tenth season organized by the International Motor Sports Association (IMSA). The season began on January 26 at Daytona International Speedway and concludes on October 14 at Road Atlanta.

Classes
 Grand Sport (GS) (run to GT4 regulations)
 Touring Car (TCR)

Calendar
The provisional 2023 calendar was released on August 5, 2022, at IMSA's annual State of the Sport Address, featuring eleven rounds.

Calendar Changes
Mid-Ohio Sports Car Course was dropped from the calendar and was replaced by a four-hour event at Indianapolis Motor Speedway. An event at the new Detroit Street Circuit was also added to the schedule.
The Detroit event will only feature GS-class entries, while the event at Lime Rock Park will only feature TCR entries, ensuring a 10-round schedule for both classes.

Entry list

Grand Sport (GS)

Touring Car (TCR)

Race results 
Bold indicates overall winner.

References

Notes

External links
 Official website

Michelin Pilot Challenge
Michelin Pilot Challenge
Michelin Pilot Challenge